Ernst Gustav Herter (14 May 1846, Berlin – 19 December 1917, Berlin) was a German sculptor. He specialized in creating statues of mythological figures.

Life and work
In 1869 he created his own studio. In 1875, he made a study trip to Italy. Professor Herter was a member of the Prussian Academy of Arts.

On 8 July 1899, Herter was present in New York when his Heinrich Heine memorial sculpture, known as the Lorelei Fountain, was unveiled in The Bronx, New York City. The Lorelei Fountain was originally intended for Heine's city of birth, Düsseldorf, to mark the centenary of his birth. This project was squelched due to the antisemitic and nationalistic sentiment that pervaded the German Reich at that time.

Among his most famous works is Sterbender Achill (Dying Achilles), created in Berlin in 1884. The statue was acquired by the Empress of Austria and became the centerpiece at her palace Achilleion in Corfu, Greece. His second original sculpture of Dying Achilles is in Poland in Elbląg at Łączności street opposite the City Hall. It was a gift from the German Ministry of Culture and Arts.

Selected sculptures

References

External links

1846 births
1917 deaths
20th-century German sculptors
20th-century German male artists
German male sculptors
19th-century sculptors